Nen Sothearoth (born 24 December 1995) is a Cambodian footballer who plays as a full back or centre back  for Nagaworld.

International career

Junior teams
Nen Sothearoth played for Cambodia's under-21 team at the 2012 Hassanal Bolkiah Trophy, making his debut in a 2–1 loss to Vietnam. He also played for the under-23 side in the 2015 Southeast Asian games tournament, taking part in all Cambodia's games. On 17 August 2017, he scored a penalty goal after a Vietnamese player handled the ball in penalty box, the only goal that the Cambodian U-22 team scored during the 2017 Southeast Asian Games campaign.

Senior team
Nen Sothearoth made his international debut in an unofficial friendly match against the Philippines in 2012. He played in his first official matches for Cambodia three years later during qualification for the 2018 World Cup.

Club career
Nen Sothearoth started playing for Svay Rieng in 2011, although he was part of a debated incident in a controversial match against Phnom Penh Crown as in minute 41 he appeared to clear the ball off the line with his hand. Referee Thong Chankethya missed the incident and only gave a corner, the first of four such incidents in the match.

References

1995 births
Living people
Cambodian footballers
Cambodia international footballers
Preah Khan Reach Svay Rieng FC players
Nagaworld FC players
Association football defenders
Competitors at the 2017 Southeast Asian Games
Sportspeople from Phnom Penh
Southeast Asian Games competitors for Cambodia
21st-century Cambodian people